The streets of London are the roads and thoroughfares of London, the capital of the United Kingdom. See :Category:Streets in London.

It may also refer to:

 "Streets of London" (song), 1969 song written by Ralph McTell
 Streets of London (computer game), 1983 text adventure
 The Streets of London, a 1906 documentary by Charles Urban 
 The Streets of London (1929 film), a British crime film
 The Streets of London (1934 film), an Australian melodrama

See also
"Dark Streets of London", a song by the Pogues
London A-Z, a street map
"The Knowledge" of London streets and routes required of taxi drivers since the 19th century